Otoyol 33, O-33 or North Aegean Motorway and abbreviated as the O-33 is a  long toll motorway in western Turkey.Beginning at an intersection with İzmir Beltway, the O-33 runs north from Çiğli to Bergama and parallels the D550 for most of its route.

History 
On 15 February 2017 the tender to construct the motorway was awarded to a consortium of three companies, IC İçdaş, Kalyon and Astaldi. Like other otoyol projects in Turkey, the tender was awarded under a build-operate-transfer contract until 2027. Groundbreaking for the highway took place on 5 April 2017 in a ceremony attended by Prime Minister Binali Yıldırım and Minister of Transport Ahmet Arslan. The 408.2 million motorway was opened to traffic on 30 October 2019.

The designation O-33 had previously been used for the Bursa Beltway, now designated as a part of the O-5 and O-22.

Exit list

See also
 List of highways in Turkey

References 

Transport in İzmir Province
33
Toll roads in Turkey